Farag is a surname. Notable people with the surname include:

Given name
Farag Foda (1946–1992), Egyptian professor, writer, columnist, and human rights activist

Surname
Ahmed Hassan Farag (born 1982), Egyptian footballer
Ahmed Samir Farag (born 1986), Egyptian footballer
Alfred Farag (1929–2005), eminent Egyptian playwright of the post-1952 Revolution period
Ali Farag, (born 1992), professional squash player who represents Egypt
Andy Farag, the percussionist for rock band Umphrey's McGee
Haiat Farag (born 1987), amateur Egyptian freestyle wrestler who played for the women's middleweight category
Ibrahim Farag (born 1990), Egyptian freestyle wrestler
Ismael Ali Farag al Bakush, Libyan detainee held in extrajudicial detention in the Guantanamo Bay detention camps in Cuba
Mohamad Farag (born 1986), Midfielder or central midfielder or attacking midfielder
Mohammed Abdul-Salam Farag (1954–1982), Egyptian radical Islamist and theorist
Mohamed Farag Bashmilah, citizen of Yemen, reportedly a subject of the United States' extraordinary rendition program
Nagaite Farag on The Apprentice (Irish TV series)
Nigel Farage (born 1964), Anti immigrant British politician
Sami Farag (1935–2015), Egyptian lawyer, judge, prosecutor and vice-president of the Supreme Constitutional Court of Egypt
Yasser Ibrahim Farag (born 1984), Egyptian athlete competing in the shot put and discus throw events

See also
Faragism, an ideology and practice associated with the followers and supporters of Nigel Farage
Faraj
Farrag
Farage (surname)
Rod El Farag, an administrative region forming about one third of Shobra in Cairo, Egypt
Fag Rag
Faragheh
Faragher